Pomar may refer to:

People
 Arturo Pomar (1931–2016), Spanish chess Grandmaster
 Júlio Pomar (born 1926), Portuguese painter
 Juan Bautista Pomar (1535–1590), historian and writer on pre-Columbian Aztec history

Places
 Medina de Pomar, a municipality in Burgos, Castile and León, Spain
 Picó Pomar Residence, an 1840 Spanish Neoclassical building
 Pomar de Valdivia, a municipality in Palencia, Castile and León, Spain

Others
 Bodegas Pomar, C.A., a Venezuela wine maker
 El Pomar Foundation, Colorado, U.S.
 UD Pomar, a football team based in Pomar de Cinca, Aragón, Spain